George Payne may refer to:
George David Payne (1853–1916), Australian architect
George Payne (Freemason) (1685–1757)
George Payne (racehorse owner) (1804–1878), English breeder of thoroughbred horses
George Payne (baseball) (1889–1959), American baseball pitcher and member of the Texas League Hall of Fame
George Payne (Australian footballer) (1893–1962), Australian rules footballer who played for South Melbourne
George Payne (footballer, born 1921) (1921–1987), English footballer who played as a goalkeeper for Tranmere Rovers and Northwich Victoria
George Payne (footballer, born 1887) (1887–1932), former Tottenham Hotspur, Crystal Palace and Sunderland player
George Payne (cricketer) (1850–1892), English cricketer
George Payne (actor), American pornographic actor
George Henry Payne (1876–1945), author and publisher